The North Greenville Crusaders are the athletic teams representing North Greenville University, located in Tigerville, South Carolina, in intercollegiate sports as a member of the NCAA Division II ranks, primarily competing in the Conference Carolinas (CC; formerly known as the Carolinas–Virginia Athletic Conference (CVAC) until after the 2006–07 school year) since the 2011–12 academic year. They were also a member of the National Christian College Athletic Association (NCCAA), primarily competing as an independent in the South Region of the Division I level. The Crusaders previously competed as a member of the Mid-South Conference (MSC) of the National Association of Intercollegiate Athletics (NAIA) from 1995–96 to 2000–01.

Varsity teams 
NGU competes in 20 intercollegiate varsity sports: Men's sports include baseball, basketball, cross country, football, golf, lacrosse, soccer, tennis, track & field and volleyball; while women's sports include basketball, cross country, golf, lacrosse, soccer, softball, tennis, track & field and volleyball; and co-ed sports include cheerleading.

Baseball 
North Greenville has had 9 Major League Baseball Draft selections since the draft began in 1965. The team won the NCAA Division II national championship in 2022.

Football

Volleyball 
The men's volleyball team advanced to the 2022 NCAA Men's National Collegiate Volleyball Tournament, in which it defeated Princeton and lost to defending national champion Hawaii.

References

External links